Ali Fateh (also Romanized as ʿAlī Fateḥ) is a village in Holayjan Rural District, in the Central District of Izeh County, Khuzestan Province, Iran. At the 2006 census, its population was 109, in 20 families.

References 

Populated places in Izeh County